Tricimba is a genus of frit flies in the family Chloropidae. There are about 7 described species in Tricimba.

Species
 Tricimba brunnicollis (Becker, 1912)
 Tricimba cincta (Meigen, 1830)
 Tricimba lineella (Fallen, 1820)
 Tricimba melancholica (Becker, 1912)
 Tricimba occidentalis Sabrosky, 1938
 Tricimba spinigera Malloch, 1913
 Tricimba trisculcata (Adams, 1905)

References

Further reading

External links

 Diptera.info

Oscinellinae